The Remington Rand 409, a punched card calculator which was programmed with a plugboard, was designed in 1949. It was sold in two models: the UNIVAC 60 (1952) and the UNIVAC 120 (1953). The model number referred to the number of decimal digits it could read from each punched card.

The machine was designed in "The Barn", at 33 Highland Ave. in Rowayton, Connecticut, a building that currently houses the Rowayton Public Library and Community Center.

These machines were discontinued when the UNIVAC 1004 was introduced in 1962. About 1000 total had been produced by 1961.

Architecture
Numbers were fixed-point and of variable length (one to ten digits). Arithmetic was done in floating point, but all results were converted to fixed point when stored in memory.

Digits are represented in bi-quinary coded decimal. Each digit of memory storage contained five tubes. Four of these represented the digits 1, 3, 5, and 7, while the fifth tube represented 9 if activated alone but added 1 to the value if activated together with another tube.

Hardware

See also
List of UNIVAC products
History of computing hardware
List of vacuum-tube computers

Notes

Further reading
 Electronic Brains: Stories from the dawn of the computer age, chapter 3 (pp. 53–73), Mike Hally, 2005, ISBN 978-0-309-09630-0.

External links
Rowayton, Connecticut: Birthplace of the World's First Business Computer
Rowayton Public Library Website
Universal Automatic Computer Model 60 A Third Survey of Domestic Electronic Digital Computing Systems Report No. 1115, March 1961 by Martin H. Weik
Universal Autometic Computer Model 120 A Third Survey of Domestic Electronic Digital Computing Systems Report No. 1115, March 1961 by Martin H. Weik
Service and Programming documentation at bitsavers.org

Programmable calculators
UNIVAC unit record equipment
Vacuum tube computers
Computer-related introductions in 1952